The 2018–19 Winnipeg Jets season was the 20th season for the National Hockey League franchise that was established on June 25, 1997, and the eighth in Winnipeg, since the franchise relocated from Atlanta prior to the start of the 2011–12 NHL season. The Jets clinched a playoff spot of March 23, 2019, after a 5–0 win against the Nashville Predators. The Jets faced the St. Louis Blues in the first round of the playoffs, where they lost to the eventual Stanley Cup champions in six games.

Standings

Schedule and results

Pre-season
The pre-season schedule was published on June 12, 2018.

Regular season
The regular season schedule was released on June 21, 2018.

Playoffs

The Jets faced the St. Louis Blues in the First Round of the playoffs, and were defeated in six games.

Player statistics
As of April 20, 2019

Skaters

Goaltenders

†Denotes player spent time with another team before joining the Jets. Stats reflect time with the Jets only.
‡Denotes player was traded mid-season. Stats reflect time with the Jets only.
Bold/italics denotes franchise record.

Transactions
The Jets have been involved in the following transactions during the 2018–19 season.

Trades

Free agents

Waivers

Contract terminations

Retirement

Signings

Draft picks

Below are the Winnipeg Jets' selections at the 2018 NHL Entry Draft, which was held on June 22 and 23, 2018, at the American Airlines Center in Dallas, Texas.

Notes:
 The Boston Bruins' fifth-round pick went to the Winnipeg Jets as the result of a trade on March 1, 2017, that sent Drew Stafford to Boston in exchange for this pick (being conditional at the time of the trade). The condition – Winnipeg will receive a fifth-round pick in 2018 if the Bruins reach the 2017 Stanley Cup playoffs and Stafford plays in half of Boston's remaining games in the 2016–17 NHL season – was converted on April 4, 2017.

References

Winnipeg Jets seasons
Winnipeg Jets
Jets